Henryk Pietrzak (b. 6 March 1914 – 28 January 1990) was a Polish fighter ace of the Polish Air Force in World War II.

Biography
Pietrzak joined the Polish Air Force in 1933, as a member of the 4th Air Regiment where he was flying as a pilot of the Polish 114th Fighter Escadrille Polish 114th Fighter Escadrille and during the Invasion of Poland, he was an instructor in the Central Flying School Centrum Wyszkolenia Lotnictwa nr 1 later flew fighters with the Free French Air Force's GC III/9 squadron.

He joined No. 306 Polish Fighter Squadron as a Sergeant Pilot in August 1941, flying Hawker Hurricanes and Supermarine Spitfires, and was commissioned the following year, eventually becoming a squadron leader. On 31 December 1942 while flying a Spitfire Mk IX (Serial No. EN128) he scored the 500th victory for the UK-based Polish Air Force in the war and was later decorated by Polish President Władysław Raczkiewicz.
After starting a second tour with 306 Sqn he joined 315 Polish Fighter Squadron from July 1944 until October 1944, flying P-51 Mustang IIIs. He was awarded the DFC in August 1944.

His score was 7 ( and 2 shared) claimed destroyed and 2 damaged. All his victims were German fighter planes: 3 Messerschmitt Bf 109s and 4.5 Focke-Wulf Fw 190s.  He is also credited with destroying four V-1 flying bombs.

He settled in England after the war, commanding 309 Polish Fighter-Reconnaissance Squadron from July 1945 to January 1947, subsequently leaving the Airforce to become a farmer in Suffolk.

Awards
 Virtuti Militari, Silver Cross - 10 February 1943
 Cross of Valour, four times
 Air Medal for the War of 1939–45
 Distinguished Flying Cross (United Kingdom) - 9 February 1945

References

Further reading
 Tadeusz Jerzy Krzystek, Anna Krzystek: Polskie Siły Powietrzne w Wielkiej Brytanii w latach 1940-1947 łącznie z Pomocniczą Lotniczą Służbą Kobiet (PLSK-WAAF). Sandomierz: Stratus, 2012, s. 451. 
 Piotr Sikora: Asy polskiego lotnictwa. Warszawa: Oficyna Wydawnicza Alma-Press. 2014, s. 272-276. 
 Józef Zieliński: Asy polskiego lotnictwa. Warszawa: Agencja lotnicza ALTAIR, 1994, s. 42. ISBN 83862172.

1914 births
1990 deaths
Polish World War II flying aces
Recipients of the Distinguished Flying Cross (United Kingdom)
Recipients of the Silver Cross of the Virtuti Militari
Recipients of the Cross of Valour (Poland)